Sky's The Limit, is an America rock band formed in Virginia in 1998. The band was the first major project to highlight Dave Elkins as an artist.

History
Sky's the Limit was created in 1998 in Virginia. After performing a series of local shows they completed and released a self-titled album Sky's The Limit. The CD release quickly fell out of print and today copies are rare to find. The band disbanded as Dave Elkins formed Mae in 2001. In 2010 the album Sky's the Limit was re-released as a digital download through Spartan Records.

References

American emo musical groups
Musical groups from Virginia
Musicians from Norfolk, Virginia